The bombardment of Madras was an engagement of the First World War, at Madras (now Chennai), British India. The bombardment was initiated by the German light cruiser Emden at the outset of the war in 1914.

With Captain Karl von Müller in command, on the night of 22 September 1914, SMS  Emden quietly approached the city of Madras on the southeastern coast of the Indian peninsula. As he later wrote, "I had this shelling in view simply as a demonstration to arouse interest among the Indian population, to disturb English commerce, to diminish English prestige." After entering the Madras harbour area, Müller illuminated six large oil tanks belonging to the Burmah Oil Company with his searchlights, then fired at a range of 3,000 yards. After ten minutes of firing, Emden had hit five of the tanks and destroyed 346,000 gallons of fuel, and the cruiser then successfully retreated.

Soon the word Emden entered the Tamil dictionary and was used to describe someone powerful, frightening and with an wicked intent.

Footnotes

References and external links 

The Last Corsair: The Story of The Emden by Dan van der Vat, 1984. 
The Last Gentleman of War. The Raider Exploits of the Cruiser Emden by R. K. Lochner, Naval Institute Press:. 1988. 
The Last Cruise of the Emden: The Amazing True WWI Story of a German-Light Cruiser and Her Courageous Crew by Edwin Palmer Hoyt, Globe Pequot Press, 2001 

Karl Friedrich Max von Müller: Captain of the Emden During World War I by John M. Taylor
New York Times: "German Cruiser Emden Destroyed", November 11, 1914 a PDF of NYT report on Emden sinking along with some praise for its captain.
New York Times: "Captain of Emden Killed?", a PDF of a NYT article dated April 13, 1921

Cruisers EMDEN, Frigates EMDEN - 5 warships named EMDEN until today 
World War I Naval Combat
Karl Friedrich Max von Müller: Captain of the Emden During World War I
How German cruiser ‘Emden’ struck terror in the heart of the British Empire, and became a Tamil word. The Hindu. February 23, 2020.

Further reading 

 Frame, Tom. (2004). No Pleasure Cruise: The Story of the Royal Australian Navy. Sydney: Allen & Unwin  (paper)
Hoehling, A. A.  Lonely Command a Documentary Thomas Yoseloff, Inc., 1957.
Hoyt, Edwin P. The Last Cruise of the Emden: The Amazing True World War I Story of a German-Light Cruiser and Her Courageous Crew. The Lyons Press, 2001. .
Hohenzollern, Franz Joseph, Prince of Emden: My Experiences in S.M.S. Emden. New York: G. Howard Watt, 1928.
Lochner, R. K. Last Gentleman-Of-War: Raider Exploits of the Cruiser Emden Annapolis: Naval Institute Press, 1988. .
McClement, Fred. Guns in paradise. Paper Jacks, 1979. .
Mücke, Hellmuth von. The Emden-Ayesha Adventure: German Raiders in the South Seas and Beyond, 1914. Annapolis: Naval Institute Press, 2000. .
Schmalenbach, Paul German Raiders: A History of Auxiliary Cruisers of the German Navy, 1895-1945. Annapolis: Naval Institute Press, 1979. .
Van der Vat, Dan. Gentlemen of War: The Amazing Story of Captain Karl von Müller and the SMS Emden. New York: William Morrow and Company, Inc. 1984. 
Walter, John The Kaiser's Pirates: German Surface Raiders in World War One. Annapolis: Naval Institute Press, 1994. .

Naval battles of World War I involving Germany
India in World War I
Burmah-Castrol
Conflicts in 1914
September 1914 events